Neuendettelsau is a local authority in Middle Franconia, Germany. Neuendettelsau is situated 20 miles southwest of Nuremberg and 12 miles east of Ansbach. Since 1947 it has a Lutheran seminary (Augustana Hochschule).

Politics
The mayor is Christoph Schmoll (SPD), elected in March 2020.

Sister city
  Treignac (France), since 1996

Notable people
 Karl-Friedrich Beringer, choirmaster of the Windsbacher Knabenchor :de:Windsbacher Knabenchor
 Johann Konrad Wilhelm Loehe, Lutheran pastor and theologian.
 Walter Burkert, world-famous German scholar of ancient Greek mythology and religion.

Literature
 Matthias Honold, Hans Rößler (Hrsg.): 700 Jahre Neuendettelsau, Neuendettelsau 1998.
 Hans Rößler (Hrsg.): Unter Stroh- und Ziegeldächern. Aus der Neuendettelsauer Geschichte, Neuendettelsau  1982.

References

External links

 Homepage of the local authority Neuendettelsau
 Diakonie Neuendettelsau
 Löhe-Zeit-Museum Neuendettelsau
 Virtual museum of Neuendettelsau